The four-horned chameleon (Trioceros quadricornis) is a species of chameleon, a lizard in the family Chamaeleonidae. The species is native to highland areas in western Cameroon and southeastern Nigeria.

Taxonomy and subspecies
The four-horned chameleon was first described in 1899 by German naturalist Gustav Tornier. There are three subspecies, including the nominate race, which are recognized as being valid.

 T. q. quadricornis  – southern four-horned chameleon
 T. q. eisentrauti  – Eisentraut's chameleon
 T. q. gracilior  – northern four-horned chameleon

Nota bene: A trinomial authority in parentheses indicates that the subspecies was originally described in a genus other than Trioceros.

Etymology
The subspecific name, eisentrauti, is in honor of German zoologist Martin Eisentraut.

Distribution and habitat
The four-horned chameleon is found only in some highland areas associated with the Cameroon line across Cameroon and eastern Nigeria; its range includes the Western High Plateau, the Bamboutos massif, Mount Manengouba, Oku Massif, the Bakossi Mountains including Mount Kupe, and the Obudu Plateau in Nigeria. T. q. eisentrauti in particular is endemic to the Rumpi Hills of Cameroon. Overall, T. quadricornis has an extent of occurrence of 13,300 km2 (5,135 sq mi) and an inferred area of occupancy of 1,000 km2 (386 sq mi). Research suggests that this is likely to reflect competition with other chameleon species rather than physiological tolerances. The type locality for the species is Mount Manegouba in Cameroon.

Description and behavior
Like many other chameleons, the four-horned chameleon has a prehensile tail and single claws on its toes. Male four-horned chameleons have a prominent hemipenal bulge and a gular beard, while some female four-horned chameleons have one horn or even two horns on the tip of the snout. The species almost exclusively feeds on arthropods.

Conservation and threats
Because of its small and fragmented range coupled with numerous threats to its population, the four-horned chameleon is ranked Vulnerable by the International Union for Conservation of Nature. There are concerns that logging and agricultural expansion may contribute to deforestation and potentially threaten the status of the species by degrading its habitat; in addition, despite its status as a protected Class A species in Cameroon, its intensive exploitation by the pet trade has caused significant population declines in some cases.

References

Further reading
Böhme W, Klaver CJJ (1981). "Zur innerartlichen Gliederung und zur Artgeschichte von Chamaeleo quadricornis Tornier, 1899 (Sauria: Chamaeleonidae)". Amphibia-Reptilia 4: 313–328. (Chamaeleo quadricornis gracilior, new subspecies, pp. 317–320, Figures 2–5). (in German, with abstracts in English and French). 
Mertens R (1968). "Zur Kenntnis der Herpetofauna von Kamerun und Fernando Poo ". Bonner Zoologische Beiträge 19 (1–2): 69–84. (Chamaeleo eisentrauti, new species, pp. 70–72, Figures 1–2). (in German).
Tornier G (1899). "Drei Reptilien aus Afrika ". Zoologischer Anzeiger 22: 258–261. (Chamaeleo quadricornis, new species, pp. 259–260, Figure 2). (in German).

Trioceros
Lizards of Africa
Reptiles of West Africa
Reptiles of Cameroon
Reptiles described in 1899
Taxa named by Gustav Tornier
Fauna of the Cameroonian Highlands forests